Sölden is a town in the Breisgau-Hochschwarzwald district in Baden-Württemberg in southern Germany.

References

Breisgau-Hochschwarzwald
Baden